That’s What Happened: Live in Germany 1987 is a 98-minute DVD by Miles Davis, comprising a concert and interview, recorded in Munich, West Germany, in 1987, and released by Eagle Eye Media in 2009.

Description
The concert was recorded on July 18, 1987, at the Gasteig Philharmonie, Munich, by the ZDF.

A review in JazzTimes by Jeff Tamarkin describes the music, mostly taken from his studio albums You're Under Arrest and Tutu, as typical of Davis in the last part of his career, playing, in the same show, "exhilarating, highly charged funk jams, dark and mysterious blues and syrupy sweet, empty-calorie schmaltz". Tamarking noted that the Cyndi Lauper cover "Time After Time" elicits the most enthusiastic response from the audience, because it's the first time in the show that Davis soloes at length and accessibly. Of the individual players, Tamarkin says that Kenny Garrett does most of the "heavy lifting", bass player Darryl Jones "cooks", and Foley, on lead bass, can "shred with the best" lead guitarist.

Track listing

Personnel
Miles Davis - trumpet
Mino Cinelu - percussion
Kenny Garrett - alto saxophone, flute
Adam Holzman -  keyboards
Robert Irving III -  keyboards
Darryl Jones -  electric bass
Joseph "Foley" McCreary -  electric bass ("lead bass")
Ricky Wellman -  drums

References

External links

Miles Davis live albums